The 14th Mieczysław Połukard Criterium of Polish Speedway League Aces was the 1995 version of the Mieczysław Połukard Criterium of Polish Speedway Leagues Aces. It took place on March 26 in the Polonia Stadium in Bydgoszcz, Poland.

Starting positions draw 

 Jarosław Olszewski - Wybrzeże-Rafineria Gdańsk
 Adam Pawliczek - RKM Rybnik
 Jan Krzystyniak - Polonia Piła
 Dariusz Śledź - Sparta-Polsat Wrocław
 Tomasz Gollob - Polonia-Jutrzenka Bydgoszcz
 Marek Kępa - Motor Lublin
 Piotr Świst - Stal-Michael Gorzów Wlkp.
 Ireneusz Kwieciński - Polonia-Jutrzenka Bydgoszcz
 Andrzej Rzepka - Polonia Piła
 Jacek Krzyżaniak - Apator-Elektrim Toruń
 Roman Jankowski - Unia Leszno
 Jacek Gomólski - Polonia-Jutrzenka Bydgoszcz
 Andrzej Huszcza - ZKŻ Polmos-Beram Zielona Góra
  Václav Milík, Sr. - Wanda Kraków
 Jacek Gollob - Polonia-Jutrzenka Bydgoszcz
 Jacek Rempała - Unia Tarnów
 (R1) Tomasz Poprawski - Polonia-Jutrzenka Bydgoszcz

Heat details

Sources 
 Roman Lach - Polish Speedway Almanac

See also 

Criterium of Aces
Mieczyslaw Polukard
Mieczysław Połukard Criterium of Polish Speedway Leagues Aces